William Rankin may refer to:

 William Rankin (1920–2009), aviator and the only known survivor of falling through a thunderstorm cloud
 William Rankin (screenwriter) (1900–1966), American screenwriter of I've Got Your Number
 William Rankin (Medal of Honor), on List of Medal of Honor recipients for the Indian Wars
 William Rankin (boxer) (1898–1967), Scottish-Canadian featherweight boxer
 William Boyd Rankin, cricketer
Willie Rankin (footballer, born 1895) (1895–1950), Scottish footballer with Motherwell, Cowdenbeath, Clyde
Willie Rankin (footballer, born 1900) (1900–1968), Scottish footballer with Dundee, Blackburn, Charlton

See also
Macquorn Rankine (William John Macquorn Rankine, 1820–1872), Scottish engineer
William Rankins ( 1590s), English writer